Oculohammus densepunctatus is a species of beetle in the family Cerambycidae, and the only species in the genus Oculohammus. It was described by Breuning and de Jong in 1941.

References

Lamiinae
Beetles described in 1941